Production history of plays performed by the Idaho Shakespeare Festival, as of May 2020. The sections are sorted by venue. The festival has utilized a single venue each season, starting with the plaza outside the One Capital Center, and eventually facilitating the construction of its own theatre known as the Idaho Shakespeare Festival Amphitheater and Reserve.

One Capital Center (1977-1980) 
In 1976, founder Doug Copsey noted a green-space in downtown Boise, Idaho that could function as an outdoor performance area. The first performance of the Idaho Shakespeare Festival premiered in the summer of 1977 in the plaza outside the One Capital Center. The festival presented its first seasons in partnership with the Main Street Bistro, later known as Ray's Oasis.

In the first years of the Festival, the only plays produced were works of William Shakespeare.

The Plantation (1981-1983) 
In the spring of 1981, Ray's Oasis announced they would be vacating the One Capital Center building and the festival would need to find a new outdoor performance venue. They were given permission to use a plot of land on the Plantation Golf Club. After they drained a pond located on the site, a part of the land-use arrangement, they were able to set up a new outdoor performance area.

In the final year at this venue, the Festival produced their first work from an author other than Shakespeare.

ParkCenter (1984-1997) 
After the festival lost the lease at The Plantation, it moved to a park in Boise: ParkCenter. The Festival remained here until 1997 until the construction of its own outdoor theatre space.

The 1980s

The 1990s

Idaho Shakespeare Festival Amphitheater (1998-Present) 
In 1997, the Festival broke ground on their current home: The Idaho Shakespeare Festival Amphitheater and Reserve. Due to an agreement with the Idaho Foundation for Parks & Lands and the Idaho Department of Parks & Recreation, the theatre exists in a habitat reserve along the Boise River.

The Late 1990s

The 2000s

The 2010s 
This decade saw changes in leadership that brought new customs to the season construction. The "season musical", which had previously been performed in the fall, is now produced for the duration of the season. In addition, a slot has been specifically allotted to a murder mystery.

The 2020s 
Due to the COVID-19 Pandemic, the 2020 season, which was set to include Much Ado About Nothing, Ain't Misbehavin', Henry V, Emma, and Sleuth, was cancelled.

Cumulative Shakespeare Canon Productions 
A list of the number of times the Idaho Shakespeare Festival has produced each of Shakespeare's plays is available below. The Festival has produced A Midsummer Night's Dream the most. There are nine plays in the full Shakespeare Canon that have never been produced by the Idaho Shakespeare Festival.

*indicates shows not part of the First Folio canon.

References 

Idaho-related lists
Theatre company production histories